Third Creek Presbyterian Church and Cemetery is a historic Presbyterian church and cemetery located near Cleveland, Rowan County, North Carolina. The cemetery was added to the National Register of Historic Places in 1983.

History
The congregation was founded in 1751 and the first meeting house was located in the center of what is now the cemetery. The current church building was constructed in 1835. It is a two-story, brick building. Also on the property is the Session House, a one-story gabled roof weather-boarded log building also dating from 1835.

Gravesites
The earliest surviving gravestones in the cemetery date from 1776. One notable burial is James Graham Ramsay (1823–1903).

The most famous and unique gravesite is of a thin tombstone enclosed in a brick box with glass for viewing that is believed to be of French military commander, Marshal Michel Ney who served in Napoleon Bonaparte's army during the Napoleonic Wars. Conspiracy theorists say Ney was living under the false name "Peter Stuart Ney" as the town's schoolteacher. The plaque reads, "In Memory of Peter Stewart Ney a native of France and soldier of the French Revolution under Napoleon Bonaparte who departed this life November 15th, 1846 aged 77 years."

References

External links
Official website

Presbyterian churches in North Carolina
Churches on the National Register of Historic Places in North Carolina
Churches completed in 1835
19th-century Presbyterian church buildings in the United States
Churches in Rowan County, North Carolina
Protestant Reformed cemeteries
Cemeteries in North Carolina
National Register of Historic Places in Rowan County, North Carolina